Jane Adams may refer to:

Jane Kelley Adams (1852–1924), American educator
Jane Swain Adams (1851–1934), Australian pioneer, settler, farmer and inn-keeper
Jane Adams (actress, born 1918) (1918–2014), American performer during 1940s and early 1950s 
Jane Adams (actress, born 1965), American film, television and theatre Tony winner
Jane Adams (camogie), Northern Irish centre field since 1997
Jane Adams (writer) (born 1960), English novelist

See also
Jane Addams (1860–1935), American settlement worker, pacifist, and the first American female Nobel peace laureate
Jan Adams (disambiguation)